Leon Hart was a college and National Football League defensive end.

Leon Hart may also refer to:

Leon Hart (American football, born 1951), American football coach
Leon Hart (offensive lineman) in USA Today All-USA high school football team (2000–09)